Francis Neville (Frank) Arkell (13 September 193526 June 1998) was an Australian politician. Arkell was a long-serving Lord Mayor of Wollongong and an independent member of the New South Wales Legislative Assembly, representing Wollongong. In 1998 Arkell was violently murdered in his home, aged 62 years.  His home was exposed as the venue of pedophile parties with some boys brought from Brisbane and the Gold Coast, with Arkell identified as the one paying money to the traffickers. Arkell was a Knight of the Order of the Star of Italy, according to his biography on the Parliament of NSW site.

Early life
Arkell was born on 13 September 1935 in Port Kembla, New South Wales.

He grew up in a modest house out on the swamplands south of Wollongong, within walking distance of the Port Kembla steelworks that was built in the 1920s and which employed his truck-driving father through the Depression and beyond.

The Arkells sent their sons to the local Christian Brothers College. The most infamous of Wollongong's pederasts, former mayor Tony Bevan, went to the Christian Brothers College around the same time as Frank Arkell, as did Brian Tobin, a city councilor who later became a regular customer of Bevan's teenage male prostitutes.

Political career
Between 1974 and 1991, Arkell served as Lord Mayor of Wollongong City Council. He was elected as an independent to represent the seat of Wollongong in the New South Wales Parliament from 1984 until his defeat at the 1991 election.

Later life and death
In October 1996, Franca Arena asked in state parliament whether Arkell was the person known to the Wood Royal Commission as W1 in allegations involving paedophilia.

In 1998, seven years after he had left politics, Arkell was murdered at his home in Wollongong by Mark Valera. Arkell's head had been smashed in with a bedside lamp, an electric cord was wrapped tightly around his neck, and tie-pins protruded from his eyes and cheeks. According to a subsequently broadcast media report, a police investigator revealed that, at the time of his death, Arkell was "...facing charges which had not gone to court..."

Valera told police that he had killed Arkell because he was a "very, very horrible man". At his trial Valera attempted to run a homosexual advance defence, giving evidence that Arkell had seduced him and that they had been in a sexual relationship for more than a year. Valera claimed to have lost control when Arkell when wanted him to be the active partner for the first time. Valera also testified that he had been a victim of sexual abuse at the hands of his own father, Jack Van Krevel, from the age of seven. In convicting Valera of murder the jury had rejected the homosexual advance defense. In sentencing Valera to two terms of life imprisonment, Justice Studdert rejected Valera's evidence that he had been sexually abused by his father or that Arkell had asked him to engage in sexual activity and that this prompted a loss of self control.

Notes

 

1935 births
1998 deaths
Mayors and Lord Mayors of Wollongong
Members of the New South Wales Legislative Assembly
Australian murder victims
People murdered in New South Wales
People from Wollongong
20th-century Australian politicians
Independent members of the Parliament of New South Wales